David Samuel Tucker is a geologist in Washington state. He is a research associate at Western Washington University. He was an instructor at North Cascades Institute, and the director of the Mount Baker Volcano Research Center (now closed). He writes the blog "Northwest Geology Field Trips", a blog aimed at laypeople detailing where to find interesting geology in the Pacific Northwest. In 2015, he published a popular book on Washington geology, Geology Underfoot in Western Washington. He resides in Bellingham, Washington. In the 1980s he worked as a mountaineering guide in the Cascades, Mexico, and South America.

Education 
Tucker is a graduate of Western Washington University: 1974 (BS- Huxley College of the Environment) and 2004 (MS- Geology).

Geology research 
Tucker's geologic research focuses on volcanic rocks in the Mount Baker region in the northwestern portion of the North Cascades. Tucker obtained a master's degree in geology at Western Washington University in 2004. His thesis mapped and described the previously little known and undefined Hannegan caldera, including geochemistry of related rocks. The 3.72-million-year-old Hannegan caldera is in the North Cascades National Park a few miles northeast of Mount Shuksan. The caldera is 8x3.5 km in area. Tucker estimated the erupted volume at around 140 km3 of rhyolite magma. The caldera is traversed by trails to Hannegan Pass, Copper Ridge, and the Chilliwack River. Ruth Mountain, Icy Peak and Hannegan Peak are the dominant geographic features in the caldera.

Tucker assisted USGS geologist Wes Hildreth in field work that resulted in the first detailed geologic map of Mount Baker. He also collaborated with USGS geologist Kevin M. Scott to characterize Holocene eruption history at Mount Baker, including formation of Sherman Crater, eruption of volcanic ash (tephras) and lahars. Their research culminated in a 2020 USGS Professional Paper.

A focus of research has been a description of the entrance of the Sulphur Creek lava flow into Glacial Lake Baker 9800 years ago.

Tucker has also collaborated on studies of Mount Baker glaciers.

From 2007 to 2013, Tucker led teams of volunteers to Sherman Crater at 9500 feet on the south flank of Mount Baker to collect fumaroles gas samples for a USGS study of hazards and potential activity at Mount Baker. He also led a team that made an ice-radar transect to reveal the thickness of ice filling the 12,000- year-old Carmelo Crater at the summit plateau of Mount Baker.

In 2012, Tucker, George Mustoe, and Keith Kemplin published a paper that described the fossil footprints believed to belong to Gastornis, also known as Diatryma, a giant flightless bird in the Eocene Chuckanut Formation of Whatcom County. The track, preserved in a large sandstone slab, was found in the 2009 Racehorse Creek landslide. It was preserved by a volunteer team coordinated by Tucker and flown off the mountainside using a large helicopter to Western Washington University's Geology Department.

IWW 
Tucker is a member of the Industrial Workers of the World. He served as the General Secretary-Treasurer in the union's Chicago headquarters in 1983, and several terms on the General Executive Board, most recently in 2017–2019. He is the current secretary of the Whatcom-Skagit IWW branch.

Publications

References

External links 
Northwest Geology Field Trips
Geology Underfoot in Western Washington author page

Living people
American geologists
Western Washington University alumni
Western Washington University faculty
Year of birth missing (living people)
Industrial Workers of the World members
Writers from Bellingham, Washington
American earth scientists
21st-century American geologists
21st-century geologists
21st-century American scientists
American volcanologists
People from Whatcom County, Washington
Educators from Washington (state)
Writers from Washington (state)
Academics from Bellingham, Washington
Scientists from Bellingham, Washington